Mallory Maxine Velte (born March 4, 1995) is an American freestyle wrestler. She is a two-time bronze medalist at the World Wrestling Championships.

Career 

She won one of the bronze medals in the 62kg event at the 2018 World Wrestling Championships held in Budapest, Hungary.

In 2020, she won the gold medal in the 62kg event at the Pan American Wrestling Championships held in Ottawa, Canada. In the final, she defeated Laís Nunes of Brazil.

In 2022, she won the silver medal in the 65kg event at the Dan Kolov & Nikola Petrov Tournament held in Veliko Tarnovo, Bulgaria. She also won the silver medal in the 65kg event at the Yasar Dogu Tournament held in Istanbul, Turkey. She won one of the bronze medals in the 65kg event at the 2022 World Wrestling Championships held in Belgrade, Serbia.

Achievements

References

External links 
 

Living people
1995 births
Place of birth missing (living people)
American female sport wrestlers
World Wrestling Championships medalists
Pan American Wrestling Championships medalists
21st-century American women